The South Australian Railways 350 class comprised two diesel-electric locomotives built by the railway's Islington Railway Workshops that entered service in June 1949. They were the first diesel locomotives operated by the South Australian Railways and the first to be built by an Australian railway.

History
Locomotives number 350 and 351 spent much of their service life working in their design role as shunting locomotives – in Adelaide yard, Islington Railway Workshops, Mile End goods yard and Mount Gambier station yard. In March 1978 they were included in the transfer of South Australian Railways assets to Australian National.

Both locomotives were withdrawn in 1979. Railway historical group SteamRanger bought 350 and still owns the locomotive, operating it as a depot shunter; its very low continuous tractive effort necessitates a 150-tonne load limit when it pulls a train on the Victor Harbor–Strathalbyn section of the railway.

A preservation group at Moonta bought 351 for a proposed heritage railway venture that did not come to fruition. Subsequently, the Australian Railway Historical Society (now SteamRanger) bought it and restored it to operating condition at its depot, then at Dry Creek, before deploying it to Goolwa for use on the Victor Harbor Tourist Railway. After mechanical problems occurred it was placed on permanent loan to the National Railway Museum at Port Adelaide, where it remained for 25 years. In 2015 it was gifted to the Milang Historical Railway Museum. Following cosmetic restoration it is now a key element of the museum's outdoor static displays, especially since the installation of a locally developed driving simulator in the cab, which can be operated by visitors.

Notes

References

South Australian Railways Diagram LD-32 https://sarplans.steam4me.net/images/SAR_Rollingstock_14.gif

Bo-Bo locomotives
Railway locomotives introduced in 1949
350
Broad gauge locomotives in Australia
Diesel-electric locomotives of Australia
English Electric locomotives